WILB, the Living Bread Radio Network, is an AM radio station in Canton, Ohio, United States, that offers Catholic programming to the Canton, Akron and Cleveland areas. It has the largest Catholic radio signal in the state of Ohio.  The majority of the station programming is supplied by EWTN Radio.

WILB shares a frequency with clear channel station KYW in Philadelphia, Pennsylvania, which only broadcasts during daytime hours. It broadcasts in Canton on 94.5 FM during interrupted hours.

History

The station was founded in 1946 by Stark Broadcasting Co. as WCMW, which established WCMW-FM at about the same time on 94.9 MHz. The FM station went off the air around 1953, and the frequency went unused until 1960 when WDBN (now WQMX) signed on. By 1961 the AM station had become WHOF, and it was a Top 40 outlet in the early 1960s.

In 1967 the call letters were changed again, this time to WOIO. After going through several more format changes, it once again became a Top 40 station in the fall of 1976 as WQIO (using the slogan "Q-10") and was successful for the next few years in the waning days of AM Top 40 radio, drawing the highest ratings in the history of the station, and driving competitor WINW (also a daytime station) out of the format. When 106.9 FM in Canton (co-owned with WINW) changed to WOOS with an automated Top 40 format in 1978, WQIO's days as a Top 40 radio station were numbered, and by the fall of 1979 it began to head in a more adult contemporary direction.

In 1980, WQIO filed an application with the FCC to move the station from Canton to Canal Fulton, and broadcast full-time on 1070 kHz with 1,000 watts daytime and 500 watts nighttime. While this would have allowed WQIO to operate 24 hours a day, a Pittsburgh station also applied for the same frequency, and neither of the applications were granted, nor was WQIO able to acquire an FM station (it had passed on the chance to acquire 106.9, which went to WINW, and later pursued 95.9 in New Philadelphia, Ohio with an eye towards moving its tower closer to Canton, but was unsuccessful). Faltering in the ratings, WQIO switched to a country music format in 1981, but soon was put up for sale.

The station was purchased by Arcey Broadcasting, which changed the call letters to WRCW on June 14, 1982. The RC in the Arcey name and the call letters came from the initials of owner Ronald D. Colaner, who had joined the station in 1965 as a part-time engineer.  Over the years, WRCW ran a varied mixture of talk shows and adult contemporary music, as well as specialty programming on weekends, most notably an oldies show hosted by local personality Ricco that ran for 18 years (Ricco later landed at WDPN) and a live Sunday-morning broadcast featuring the South Land Gospel Boys that had aired since the early 1960s.

In 1998 Arcey tried to sell the station to Otter Communications, headed by Dan Ott of Youngstown, but the sale did not go through. The call sign was briefly changed to WTOF on December 7, 1998, but it was changed back to WRCW on February 1, 1999. After 22 years, Arcey Broadcasting finally sold the station to Living Bread Radio for $300,000 in April 2004
, and it became WILB on July 1, 2004, adopting a Catholic-oriented format.

In 2016, WILB purchased an FM Translator, W233CE.  On September 8, 2016, 94.5 FM went on the air.  This provides 24-hour Catholic radio to the Canton area.

See also
Theresa Carpinelli

External links
Living Bread Radio

ILB
Catholic radio stations
Radio stations established in 1946
1946 establishments in Ohio
ILB